John Wesley Watson (July 11, 1893 – January 4, 1963) was an American football player and coach. He served as the head football coach at Utah State University from 1916 to 1917, compiling a record of 8–5–2.

Head coaching record

References

External links
 

1893 births
1963 deaths
American football centers
Illinois Fighting Illini football players
Utah State Aggies football coaches
People from DeKalb, Illinois
Players of American football from Illinois